Honorary Fellowship of the American Institute of Architects (Hon. FAIA) may be awarded to foreign (non-U.S. citizen) architects and for non-architects who have made great contributions to the field of architecture or to the American Institute of Architects. The program was developed as the international counterpart to the AIA Fellowship program for US citizens or architects working primarily out of the US.

Honorary Fellows by country
The list is incomplete. Please help to improve it.

Africa

Asia
Ngô Viết Thụ, Hon. FAIA 1962, Vietnam
Kim Swoo Geun, Hon. FAIA 1982. South Korea
Muzharul Islam, Hon. FAIA 1999, Bangladesh
Seung H-Sang, Hon. FAIA 2002, South Korea
Min Hyun Sik, Hon. FAIA 2006, South Korea
Itsuko Hasegawa, Hon. FAIA 2006, Japan
Ryu Choon-Soo, Hon. FAIA 2008, South Korea
Kris Yao, Hon. FAIA 2014, Taiwan

Europe
European Honorary Fellows:

Austria
 Carl Auböck, Hon. FAIA 1971   
 Carlo Baumschlager, Hon. FAIA 2004   
 Dietmar Eberle, Hon. FAIA 2004   
 Hans Hollein, Hon. FAIA 1981   
 Wilhelm Holzbauer, Hon. FAIA 1986   
 Gustav Peichl, Hon. FAIA 1996   
 Ernst Plischke, Hon. FAIA 1988   
 Wolf D. Prix, Hon. FAIA 2006   
 Roland Rainer, Hon. FAIA 1973   
 Karl Schwanzer, Hon. FAIA 1967

Bulgaria
 Kiril Iliev Doytchev, Hon. FAIA 1990   
 Nikola Ivanor Nikolov, Hon. FAIA 1973   
 Methodi A. Pissarski, Hon. FAIA 1978   
 Gueorgui Stoilov, Hon. FAIA 1984   
 Luben N. Tonev, Hon. FAIA 1975

Czech Republic
 Vladimir Karfik, Hon. FAIA 1985   
 Vladimir Slapeta, Hon. FAIA 1992
 Ladislav Lábus, Hon. FAIA 2013

Denmark
 Jacob Blegvad, Hon. FAIA 1990   
 Inger Exner, Hon. FAIA 1992   
 Johannes Exner, Hon. FAIA 1992   
 Tobias Faber, Hon. FAIA 1987   
 Kay Fisker, Hon. FAIA 1955   
 Knud Friis, Hon. FAIA 1983   
 Jan Gehl, Hon. FAIA 2008   
 Fleming Grut, Hon. FAIA 1958   
 Preben Hansen, Hon. FAIA 1969   
 Arne Jacobsen, Hon. FAIA 1962   
 Henning Larsen, Hon. FAIA 1986   
 Jens Nielsen, Hon. FAIA 1991
 Steen Eiler Rasmussen, Hon. FAIA 1962   
 Johan Richter, Hon. FAIA 1989   
 Hans Hartvig Skaarup, Hon. FAIA 1976   
 Lene Tranberg, Hon. FAIA 2010   
 Jørn Utzon, Hon. FAIA 1970

Costa Rica
 Victor Cañas, Hon. FAIA 2009
 Jose Luis Salinas, Hon. FAIA 2006

Finland
 Alvar Aalto, Hon. FAIA 1958   
 Elissa Aalto, Hon. FAIA 1981   
 Gunnel Adlercreutz, Hon. FAIA 1997   
 Eric Dubosc, Hon. FAIA 2006   
 Aarne Ervi, Hon. FAIA 1966   
 Mikko Heikkinen, Hon. FAIA 2005   
 Markku Komonen, Hon. FAIA 2005   
 Erik Emil Krakstrom, Hon. FAIA 1979   
 Juha Ilmari Leiviskä, Hon. FAIA 1994   
 Matti K. Makinen, Hon. FAIA 1988   
 Juhani Pallasmaa, Hon. FAIA 1989   
 Raili Pietila, Hon. FAIA 1996   
 Reima Pietila, Hon. FAIA 1976   
 Aarno E. Ruusuvuori, Hon. FAIA 1982   
 Heikki Siren, Hon. FAIA 1986   
 Kaija Siren, Hon. FAIA 1986   
 Timo Suomalainen, Hon. FAIA 2000

France
 Louis Gerard Arretche, Hon. FAIA 1989 Deceased 
 Jacques Barge, Hon. FAIA 1971 Deceased 
 Eugene Beaudouin, Hon. FAIA 1964 Deceased 
 Gerard Benoit, Hon. FAIA 1985   
 Jean Canaux, Hon. FAIA 1959   
 Georges Candilis, Hon. FAIA 1968 Deceased 
 Jean-Marie Charpentier, Hon. FAIA 2003   
 Henri-Marie Delaage, Hon. FAIA 1972 Deceased 
 Solange d'Herbez de la Tour, Hon. FAIA 1986   
 Pierre-André Dufetel, Hon. FAIA 1988   
 Andre Gutton, Hon. FAIA 1963 Deceased 
 Jean Jacques Haffner, Hon. FAIA 1959 Deceased 
 Charles Edouard Jeanneret-Gris, Hon. FAIA 1961   
 G. Robert Le Ricolais, Hon. FAIA 1973 Deceased 
 Wladimir Mitrofanoff, Hon. FAIA 2001   
 Benjamin Mouton, Hon. FAIA 2008   
 Jean Nouvel, Hon. FAIA 1993   
 Dominique Perrault, Hon. FAIA 2007   
 Georges-Henri Pingusson, Hon. FAIA 1977 Deceased 
 Christian de Portzamparc, Hon. FAIA 1997   
 Andre Remondet, Hon. FAIA 1974 Deceased 
 Philippe Robert, Hon. FAIA 1993   
 Roland Schweitzer, Hon. FAIA 2006   
 Marion Tournon-Branly, Hon. FAIA 1979   
 Edouard Utudjian, Hon. FAIA 1970   
 Pierre Vago, Hon. FAIA 1952 Deceased 
 Jean Paul Viguier, Hon. FAIA 2001   
 Michel Weill, Hon. FAIA 1974 Deceased 
 Bernard Henri Zehrfuss, Hon. FAIA 1966 Deceased 
 Aymeric Zublena, Hon. FAIA 2006

Germany
 Kurt Ackermann, Hon. FAIA 1996   
 Stefan Behnisch, Hon. FAIA 2008   
 Gottfried Boehm, Hon. FAIA 1983   
 Werner Duttman, Hon. FAIA 1969   
 Meinhard von Gerkan, Hon. FAIA 1995   
 Josef Paul Kleihues, Hon. FAIA 1989 Deceased 
 Rob Krier, Hon. FAIA 1996   
 Wilhelm Kücker, Hon. FAIA 1999   
 Peter H. Oltmanns, Hon. FAIA 1976   
 Frei Otto, Hon. FAIA 1968   
 Richard Joachim Sahl, Hon. FAIA 1980   
 Detlef Schreiber, Hon. FAIA 1998 Deceased 
 Helmut C. Schulitz, Hon. FAIA 1997

Greece
 Constantin N. Decavalla, Hon. FAIA 1984   
 Constantin D. Kitsikis, Hon. FAIA 1963   
 Vassilis C. Sgoutas, Hon. FAIA 2000   
 Alexandros N. Tombazis, Hon. FAIA 1991

Hungary
 Janos Bohonyey, Hon. FAIA 1975   
 Ferenc Callmeyer, Hon. FAIA 1983   
 Jozsef Finta, Hon. FAIA 1991   
 Imre Makovecz, Hon. FAIA 1987

Ireland
 Padraig Murray, Hon. FAIA 1982   
 Sheila O'Donnell, Hon. FAIA 2010   
 Michael Scott, Hon. FAIA 1972   
 John Tuomey, Hon. FAIA 2010

Italy
 Franco Albini, Hon. FAIA 1968   
 Emilio Ambasz, Hon. FAIA 2007   
 Gaetana Aulenti, Hon. FAIA 1990   
 Carlo Aymonino, Hon. FAIA 2000   
 Emiliano Bernasconi, Hon. FAIA 1976   
 Massimo Carmassi, Hon. FAIA 2005   
 Giovanni-Batista Ceas, Hon. FAIA 1952   
 Giancarlo De Carlo, Hon. FAIA 1975   
 Lodovico Barbiano di Belgiojoso, Hon. FAIA 1988   
 Massimiliano Fuksas, Hon. FAIA 2002   
 Ignazio Gardella, Hon. FAIA 1999   
 Bruno Gabbiani, Hon. FAIA 2009   
 Vittorio Gregotti, Hon. FAIA 1999   
 Sergio Lenci, Hon. FAIA 2001   
 Luigi Moretti, Hon. FAIA 1964   
 Adolfo Natalini, Hon. FAIA 2007   
 Pier Luigi Nervi, Hon. FAIA 1957   
 Manfredi Nicoletti, Hon. FAIA 2009   
 Renzo Piano, Hon. FAIA 1982   
 Gio Ponti, Hon. FAIA 1963   
 Paolo Portoghesi, Hon. FAIA 2002   
 Aldo Rossi, Hon. FAIA 1989 Deceased 
 Gino Valle, Hon. FAIA 1993   
 Bruno Zevi, Hon. FAIA 1968   
 Malta Richard England, Hon. FAIA 1999

Netherlands
 Jacob Berend Bakema, Hon. FAIA 1966   
 Jo van den Broek, Hon. FAIA 1962   
 Jo Coenen, Hon. FAIA 2009   
 Willem Marinus Dudok, Hon. FAIA 1952   
 Ernest F. Groosman, Hon. FAIA 1977   
 Alex Johan Henri Maria Haak, Hon. FAIA 1971   
 Herman Hertzberger, Hon. FAIA 2004   
 Francine Houben, Hon. FAIA 2007   
 Rem Koolhaas, Hon. FAIA 1999   
 Winy Maas, Hon. FAIA 2009   
 Aldo van Eyck, Hon. FAIA 1982

Norway
 Sverre Fehn, Hon. FAIA 1989   Deceased
 Kjell Lund, Hon. FAIA 1996   Deceased
 Nils Slaatto, Hon. FAIA 1996 Deceased
 Kristin Jarmund, Hon. FAIA 2011
 Reiulf Ramstad, Hon. FAIA 2016

Poland
 Jerzy Buszkiewicz, Hon. FAIA 1981   
 Henryk Buszko, Hon. FAIA 1974   
 Adolf Ciborowski, Hon. FAIA 1980   
 Jerzy Hryniewiecki, Hon. FAIA 1962   
 Stanisław Jankowski, Hon. FAIA 1982

Portugal
 Alfredo Victor Jorge Álvares, Hon. FAIA 1967, Deceased
 Álvaro Siza Vieira, Hon. FAIA 1996   
 Eduardo Souto de Moura, Hon. FAIA 2007

Spain
 Fuensanta Nieto, Hon. FAIA 2015
 :de:Enrique Sobejano, Hon. FAIA 2015 
 Luis Jesus Arizmendi Amiel, Hon. FAIA 1972   
 Juan Navarro Baldeweg, Hon. FAIA 2001 
 Carme Pigem Barcelo, Hon. FAIA 2010   
 Ricardo Bofill, Hon. FAIA 1985   
 Oriol Bohigas, Hon. FAIA 1993   
 Juan Gonzalez Cebrian, Hon. FAIA 1975   
 Mario Corea, Hon. FAIA 2010   
 Rafael de La-Hoz, Hon. FAIA 1980   
 Rafael Moneo, Hon. FAIA 1993   
 Juan Bassegoda Nonell, Hon. FAIA 1994   
 Ramon Vilalta Pujol, Hon. FAIA 2010   
 Rafael Aranda Quiles, Hon. FAIA 2010   
 Ignasi de Solà-Morales, Hon. FAIA 1995 Deceased

Sweden
 Hakon Claes Axel Ahlberg, Hon. FAIA 1952   
 Nils Carlson, Hon. FAIA 1992   
 Ralph Erskine, Hon. FAIA 1966   
 Carl Nyrén, Hon. FAIA 1993   
 Ervin P. Pütsep, Hon. FAIA 1983   
 Sten Olov Samuelson, Hon. FAIA 1984   
 Anders Tengbom, Hon. FAIA 1978   
 Lennart Uhlin, Hon. FAIA 1977   
 Carl Martin William-Olson, Hon. FAIA 1952

Switzerland
 Max Bill, Hon. FAIA 1964   
 Mario Botta, Hon. FAIA 1983   
 Pierre H. Bussat, Hon. FAIA 1984   
 Justus Dahinden, Hon. FAIA 1973   
 William Dunkel, Hon. FAIA 1969   
 Charles Edouard Geisendorf, Hon. FAIA 1968
 Jacques Herzog, Hon. FAIA 2003   
 Pierre de Meuron, Hon. FAIA 2003     
 Alfred Roth, Hon. FAIA 1966   
 Alberto Sartoris, Hon. FAIA 1985   
 Peter Zumthor, Hon. FAIA 2004

Turkey
 Dogan Kuban, Hon. FAIA 1994   
 Gulsun Saglamer, Hon. FAIA 2006
 Suha Ozkan, Hon. FAIA 2004

USSR
 Pavel Vasilievitch Abrosimov, Hon. FAIA 1958   
 Nicolai Barfolomeitch Baranov, Hon. FAIA 1973   
 Vakhtang Davitaia, Hon. FAIA 1992   
 Alexander P. Kudryavtsev, Hon. FAIA 1992   
 Gueorgui Mikhaylovich Orlov, Hon. FAIA 1972   
 Yuri P. Platanov, Hon. FAIA 1990   
 Michail Vassilievich Posokhin, Hon. FAIA 1978

United Kingdom
Monica Pidgeon, Hon. FAIA 1987

Oceania
 Richard Francis-Jones, Hon. FAIA 2012

South America
 Gonzalo Mardones Viviani, Hon. FAIA 2016
 Fernando Romero
 Giancarlo Mazzanti, Hon. FAIA 2017

See also
 Fellow of the American Institute of Architects

References

 
Lists of architects